Snehamante Idera is a 2001 Indian Telugu-language buddy comedy drama film produced by R.B. Chowdhary under the Super Good Films banner and directed by Balasekaran. It stars Nagarjuna Akkineni, Sumanth, Sudhakar, Bhumika Chawla and Prathyusha, with music composed by Shiva Shankar. It is a remake of the Malayalam film Friends. The film was an average grosser at the box office. The film reuses comedy scenes from the Tamil version. It was dubbed into Hindi in 2007 as Naya Jigar.

Plot
Aravind (Nagarjuna Akkineni), Chandru (Sumanth) and Kimoo (Sudhakar) have been best friends since childhood. They value friendship above everything else, including family. Chandru, an orphan, stays with Aravind and is regarded by Aravind's parents as a second son. Aravind's sister Amrita (Prathyusha) falls in love with Chandru. Chandru is hesitant as she is the sister of his best friend. Chandru seeks the help of Krishna Murthy to avoid Amrita. Some brushes with the law force Aravindan and Chandru to lie low in Hyderabad for a couple of days, where they and Krishnamoorthy take up jobs as painters in a mansion under contractor Bhavani Shankar (Brahmanandam), who is Krishnamurthy's paternal uncle. Aravind falls in love with Padmini (Bhumika Chawla), who lives in the mansion, though Padmini only considers him as a friend; nevertheless, she is grateful to him when he saves her from accidental electrocution.

However, Padmini's cousin, Swathi (Abhinayashree) has a crush on Aravind and is enraged when she realizes that he is in love with her Padmini. Swathi sends false letters to him in Padmini's name, making him believe that his love is reciprocated. So, when Padmini suddenly gets engaged to another man, Chandru stands up for Aravind's love and insults Padmini in front of her entire family, causing her engagement to get canceled. This makes Padmini decide to marry Aravind but to take revenge on Chandru by breaking his and Aravind's friendship. But during their marriage, Aravind and Padmini realize that Swathi is behind all the mishaps which had taken place and that Chandru is innocent. Padmini reconciles with Chandru, and Chandru's and Amrita's wedding is fixed.

Gowtham (Sriman) is Aravind's cousin who lusts for Amrita. He plans to separate Aravind and Chandru so that he can marry Amrita. He first sets Amrita's sari on fire while she is cooking in the kitchen. Chandru blames Padmini for the mishap as she was in the kitchen with Amrita at the time, even though Padmini is innocent, no one, including Aravind, believes Chandru. Gowtham, then, turns his eye on the annual bullock race in which Chandru is taking part, by loosening the wheels on Chandru's cart to cause a serious accident and frame Padmini as the culprit, thus creating a wedge between Chandru and Aravind. Unfortunately for Gowtham, Aravind decides to take part in the race in Chandru's place since Chandru is to be married, and manages to win despite using the broken bullock cart.

Chandru accuses Padmini of trying to kill him. Padmini threatens to leave the house if Aravind remains friends with Chandru and does not throw him out of the house. Aravind then reveals to her that he had accidentally killed Chandru's deaf-and-dumb younger brother (Master Abhinai) when they were children, which traumatized him so much that he never told anyone about it. Since then, he has been looking out for Chandru out of the guilt that he had no one else in his life anymore. Gowtham overhears their conversation and tells Chandru about it to anger him. Chandru fights with Aravind, breaks their friendship, and leaves the house. Aravind tries to convince Chandru to return and marry Amrita, even if he cannot repair their friendship. However, in the process, Aravind falls from a cliff and seemingly dies. Although Chandru tries to save Aravind, he blames himself for Aravind's fall. Chandru later realizes that his brother was accidentally killed and that Aravind was not intentionally at fault.

Five years later, Chandru is a Major in the Indian Army and has never returned to Aravind's home since his supposed death. He receives a letter from Kimoo stating that Aravind is not dead, but in a vegetative state, not responding to anyone and only sitting in a corner. Chandru immediately leaves for Aravind's house, where he also learns that Aravind and Padmini have a young son whose name is Chandru, in tribute to their friendship. Meanwhile, Gowtham, who has been torturing Padmini and Amrita since Aravind went into the vegetative state, finds out that Chandru has returned and beats him up. On hearing Chandru's cries, Aravind wakes up from his coma state and subdues Gowtham and his goons. In the end, Aravind, Chandru, and Krishnamurthy, as well as Aravind and Padmini & Chandru and Amrita, are reunited happily.

Cast

 Nagarjuna Akkineni as Aravind
 Sumanth as Chandrasekhar "Chandru"
 Sudhakar as Krishna Murthy "Kimoo"
 Bhumika Chawla as Padmini
 Prathyusha as Amrutha
 Abhinayashree as Swathi
 Brahmanandam as Bhavani Shankar
 Ali as Gopal
 Sriman as Gowtham, Aravind's cousin
 Venu Madhav
 Tanikella Bharani as Manager Appalaraju
 Chalapathi Rao as Aravind's father
 Sangeetha as Aravind's mother
 Giri Babu as Aravind's uncle and Gautham's father
 Sathyapriya as Aravind's aunt and Gautham's mother
 Jaya Prakash Reddy as Padmini's uncle
 Shanoor Sana as Padmini's aunt
 Rama Prabha as Padmini's grandmother
 Saraswatamma as Aravind's grandmother
 Narra Venkateswara Rao as Padmini's father's friend
 Rami Reddy as Puliraju
 Lakshmi Rathan as Padmini's father
 Ramatherdha
 Gautham Raju as Watchman
 Telangana Shakuntala
 Gadiraju Subba Rao
 Lakhamshetty Nageswara Rao
 Ruthika as Ratna
 Master Abhinai as Chinna
 Master Kireeti as Young Aravind
 Master Tanush as Young Chandru
 Master Vijay as Young Kimoo

Soundtrack

The music was composed by Shiva Shankar. Music released on Aditya Music Company. "Rukku Rukku" was reused from the Tamil version.

References

External links
 

2001 films
Telugu remakes of Malayalam films
2000s Telugu-language films
2000s buddy comedy-drama films
Indian buddy comedy-drama films
Films directed by Balasekaran
2001 comedy films
2001 drama films
Super Good Films films